Liu Bian (176 – 6 March 190), also known as Emperor Shao of Han and the Prince of Hongnong, was the 13th emperor of the Eastern Han dynasty in China. He became emperor around the age of 13 upon the death of his father, Emperor Ling, and ruled briefly from 15 May to 28 September 189 before he was deposed, after which he became known as the "Prince of Hongnong". His emperor title, "Emperor Shao" (literally "young emperor"), was also used by other emperors who were in power for very short periods of time. In March 190, he was poisoned by Dong Zhuo, the warlord who deposed him and replaced him with his younger half-brother, Liu Xie (Emperor Xian).

Family background 
Liu Bian was born in 176 to Liu Hong (Emperor Ling) and one of his consorts, Lady He. At the time of his birth, he was Emperor Ling's only son because the emperor's other sons who were born before Liu Bian died prematurely. As Emperor Ling believed that he lost his previous sons due to bad luck, he ordered Shi Zimiao, a Taoist, to raise his newborn son; Liu Bian was given the title "Marquis Shi". Liu Bian's mother, Lady He, became empress in 180. In 181, another of Emperor Ling's consorts, Beautiful Lady Wang, gave birth to a son, Liu Xie. Empress He, in her jealousy, had Beautiful Lady Wang poisoned to death. The motherless Liu Xie was raised by his grandmother, Empress Dowager Dong, and given the title "Marquis Dong".

When his subjects asked him to name one of his sons as crown prince, Emperor Ling had a dilemma between Liu Bian and Liu Xie, his only two surviving sons. He felt that Liu Bian was unfit to be emperor because he was frivolous and unable to command respect, so he preferred Liu Xie. However, he was also worried that if he chose Liu Xie, Empress He would turn to her half-brother, He Jin, for help. He Jin held the position of General-in-Chief and was a highly influential figure in the imperial court. He ultimately did not name either of his sons as crown prince.

Reign 
When Emperor Ling became critically ill in 189, he secretly entrusted an eight-year-old Liu Xie to a close aide and eunuch, Jian Shuo. Upon the emperor's death, Jian Shuo attempted to lure He Jin into a trap in the palace, assassinate him, and then install Liu Xie on the throne. Jian Shuo's plan to make Liu Xie emperor ultimately failed, so a 13-year-old Liu Bian was enthroned and became historically known as Emperor Shao. Empress He, as the emperor's mother, became empress dowager and attended imperial court sessions alongside her son. As Emperor Shao was still young, General-in-Chief He Jin and Grand Tutor Yuan Wei served as his regents.

In the summer of 189, after learning that Jian Shuo wanted to assassinate him, He Jin and his supporters launched a preemptive move against the eunuch and had him arrested and executed. Months later, Yuan Shao suggested to He Jin to eliminate the eunuch faction and consolidate power. Although Empress Dowager He strongly objected to He Jin's plan, the General-in-Chief, acting on Yuan Shao's advice, attempted to push his idea. He instigated a few regional warlords to lead their troops into the vicinity of Luoyang, the imperial capital, and openly demand that the eunuchs be executed – in the hope of pressuring Empress Dowager He into agreeing. The empress dowager, however, sided with and protected the eunuchs. In retaliation, the eunuchs hatched a plot to assassinate He Jin: they issued a fake imperial order in Empress Dowager He's name, instructing He Jin to enter the imperial palace, where he fell into an ambush and was killed by the eunuchs.

After He Jin's death, his subordinates Wu Kuang and Zhang Zhang, along with Yuan Shao, Yuan Shu and others, led their troops to storm the palace and kill the eunuchs in revenge. They indiscriminately slaughtered anyone who looked like a eunuch; some young men who had no facial hair, in desperation, dropped their pants in front of the soldiers to prove that they were not eunuchs. During the attack, the eunuchs took Emperor Shao, the Prince of Chenliu (Liu Xie) and Empress Dowager He hostage and tried to flee from the palace. Lu Zhi intercepted the eunuch Duan Gui and saved the empress dowager from him. He Jin's younger brother, He Miao, who was sympathetic towards the eunuchs, was killed by Wu Kuang and Dong Min. Over 2,000 people died in the attack.

Emperor Shao and Liu Xie, who were taken out of the palace by the eunuchs during the chaos, were eventually found near the riverbank and saved by Lu Zhi and Min Gong. As Lu Zhi and Min Gong were escorting the emperor and prince back to the imperial palace, they were intercepted by forces under the command of Dong Zhuo, one of the warlords initially summoned by He Jin to put pressure on Empress Dowager He. When Dong Zhuo met them, Emperor Shao was so shocked that he could not express his thoughts clearly. In contrast, Liu Xie had no difficulty in describing what happened and, in Dong Zhuo's impression, behaved more like an emperor than Emperor Shao. Dong Zhuo thus conceived the idea of deposing Emperor Shao and replacing him with Liu Xie.

Deposal and death 
After escorting the emperor and prince back to Luoyang, Dong Zhuo took advantage of the power vacuum created by the conflict between He Jin and the eunuch faction to seize control of the central government and imperial court. Many officials and the imperial troops stationed in Luoyang felt intimidated by the elite, battle-tested soldiers whom Dong Zhuo brought along with him from Liang Province. Dong Zhuo eventually had Emperor Shao deposed and replaced with Liu Xie, who became historically known as Emperor Xian. The former Emperor Shao was given the honorary title "Prince of Hongnong". Later that year, Dong Zhuo had Empress Dowager He poisoned to death in Yong'an Palace.

In early 190, after a coalition of warlords launched a campaign against Dong Zhuo in the name of freeing Emperor Xian and the central government from his control, Dong Zhuo became worried that the warlords might restore the Prince of Hongnong to the throne and hence threaten the legitimacy of the government he controlled in Luoyang. Within a month after the campaign started, Dong Zhuo sent his adviser Li Ru to force the prince to commit suicide by drinking poisoned wine. The prince was allowed to bid his wife, Consort Tang, and other concubines farewell before succumbing to his fate. However, in the Romance of the Three Kingdoms, the former emperor writes a poem that upsets Dong Zhuo who then sends Li Ru to kill him. He was buried in a tomb originally constructed for the eunuch Zhao Zhong and later posthumously honoured as "Prince Huai of Hongnong".

Era name 
 Zhaoning (15 May – 28 September 189)

Family
Consorts and Issue:
 Princess Consort of Hongnong, of the Tang clan

Ancestry

See also 
 Chinese emperors family tree (early)#Han dynasty, Xin dynasty and Shu Han
 Lists of people of the Three Kingdoms

References

 Fan, Ye (5th century). Book of the Later Han (Houhanshu).
 Sima, Guang (1084). Zizhi Tongjian, Volume 59.

176 births
190 deaths
2nd-century births
2nd-century deaths
Eastern Han dynasty emperors
Imperials during the end of the Han dynasty
Monarchs deposed as children
Child monarchs from Asia
2nd-century Chinese monarchs
Emperors from Luoyang
Executed Han dynasty people
People executed by the Han dynasty
Forced suicides of Chinese people
2nd-century executions
Executed people from Henan
Murdered Chinese emperors
Dethroned monarchs